Kandawgalay (lit. "little lake") is a ward in Rangoon, Burma located near Yangon Zoological Garden and Kandawgyi Lake, a man-made lake.

Yangon
Lakes of Myanmar